Mercers Saltworks is a former settlement in Summers County, West Virginia, United States. Mercers Saltworks was located on the New River, east of Lick Creek and appeared on maps as late as 1932.

References

Geography of Summers County, West Virginia
Ghost towns in West Virginia